In six-dimensional geometry, a pentellated 6-cube is a convex uniform 6-polytope with 5th order truncations of the regular 6-cube.

There are unique 16 degrees of pentellations of the 6-cube with permutations of truncations, cantellations, runcinations, and sterications. The simple pentellated 6-cube is also called an expanded 6-cube, constructed by an expansion operation applied to the regular 6-cube. The highest form, the pentisteriruncicantitruncated 6-cube, is called an omnitruncated 6-cube with all of the nodes ringed. Six of them are better constructed from the 6-orthoplex given at pentellated 6-orthoplex.

Pentellated 6-cube

Alternate names 
 Pentellated 6-orthoplex
 Expanded 6-cube, expanded 6-orthoplex
 Small teri-hexeractihexacontitetrapeton (Acronym: stoxog) (Jonathan Bowers)

Images

Pentitruncated 6-cube

Alternate names 
 Teritruncated hexeract (Acronym: tacog) (Jonathan Bowers)

Images

Penticantellated 6-cube

Alternate names 
 Terirhombated hexeract (Acronym: topag) (Jonathan Bowers)

Images

Penticantitruncated 6-cube

Alternate names 
 Terigreatorhombated hexeract (Acronym: togrix) (Jonathan Bowers)

Images

Pentiruncitruncated 6-cube

Alternate names 
 Tericellirhombated hexacontitetrapeton (Acronym: tocrag) (Jonathan Bowers)

Images

Pentiruncicantellated 6-cube

Alternate names 
 Teriprismatorhombi-hexeractihexacontitetrapeton (Acronym: tiprixog) (Jonathan Bowers)

Images

Pentiruncicantitruncated 6-cube

Alternate names 
 Terigreatoprismated hexeract (Acronym: tagpox) (Jonathan Bowers)

Images

Pentisteritruncated 6-cube

Alternate names 
 Tericellitrunki-hexeractihexacontitetrapeton (Acronym: tactaxog) (Jonathan Bowers)

Images

Pentistericantitruncated 6-cube

Alternate names 
 Tericelligreatorhombated hexeract (Acronym: tocagrax) (Jonathan Bowers)

Images

Omnitruncated 6-cube

The omnitruncated 6-cube has 5040 vertices, 15120 edges, 16800 faces (4200 hexagons and 1260 squares), 8400 cells, 1806 4-faces, and 126 5-faces. With 5040 vertices, it is the largest of 35 uniform 6-polytopes generated from the regular 6-cube.

Alternate names 
 Pentisteriruncicantituncated 6-cube or 6-orthoplex (omnitruncation for 6-polytopes)
 Omnitruncated hexeract
 Great teri-hexeractihexacontitetrapeton (Acronym: gotaxog) (Jonathan Bowers)

Images

Full snub 6-cube 

The full snub 6-cube or omnisnub 6-cube, defined as an alternation of the omnitruncated 6-cube is not uniform, but it can be given Coxeter diagram  and symmetry [4,3,3,3,3]+, and constructed from 12 snub 5-cubes, 64 snub 5-simplexes, 60 snub tesseract antiprisms, 192 snub 5-cell antiprisms, 160 3-sr{4,3} duoantiprisms, 240 4-s{3,4} duoantiprisms, and 23040 irregular 5-simplexes filling the gaps at the deleted vertices.

Related polytopes
These polytopes are from a set of 63 uniform 6-polytopes generated from the B6 Coxeter plane, including the regular 6-cube or 6-orthoplex.

Notes

References
 H.S.M. Coxeter: 
 H.S.M. Coxeter, Regular Polytopes, 3rd Edition, Dover New York, 1973 
 Kaleidoscopes: Selected Writings of H.S.M. Coxeter, edited by F. Arthur Sherk, Peter McMullen, Anthony C. Thompson, Asia Ivic Weiss, Wiley-Interscience Publication, 1995,  
 (Paper 22) H.S.M. Coxeter, Regular and Semi Regular Polytopes I, [Math. Zeit. 46 (1940) 380-407, MR 2,10]
 (Paper 23) H.S.M. Coxeter, Regular and Semi-Regular Polytopes II, [Math. Zeit. 188 (1985) 559-591]
 (Paper 24) H.S.M. Coxeter, Regular and Semi-Regular Polytopes III, [Math. Zeit. 200 (1988) 3-45]
 Norman Johnson Uniform Polytopes, Manuscript (1991)
 N.W. Johnson: The Theory of Uniform Polytopes and Honeycombs, Ph.D. 
  x4o3o3o3o3x - stoxog, x4x3o3o3o3x - tacog, x4o3x3o3o3x - topag, x4x3x3o3o3x - togrix, x4x3o3x3o3x - tocrag, x4o3x3x3o3x - tiprixog, x4x3x3o3x3x - tagpox, x4x3o3o3x3x - tactaxog, x4x3x3o3x3x - tocagrax, x4x3x3x3x3x - gotaxog

External links 
 
 Polytopes of Various Dimensions
 Multi-dimensional Glossary

6-polytopes